.

Daasarathi krishnamacharya, popularly known as Daasarathi,  also spelled as Daasharathi (22 July 1925 – 5 November 1987) was a Telugu poet and writer. Daasarathi holds the titles Abhyudhaya kavi and Kalaprapurna. He was also the recipient of Sahitya Academy Award for his poetic work book Timiramto Samaram (Fight against Darkness) in 1974. He was also chosen as Aasthana Kavi of the Andhra Pradesh Government.

Early life
Krishnamacharyulu Dasarathi was born as Daasarathi on 22 July 1925 in a middle-class Vaishnava Brahmin family. His native village Chinnaguduru is in the Maripeda Mandal, Mahabubabad district. An orthodox, but discreet, Vaishnava bhakta, he was an erudite scholar of Indian Puranas with a fine grip on Telugu, Sanskrit and Tamil languages. He matriculated from the Khammam Government High School but gave up higher education to join the movement against the autocratic Nizam rule in the Hyderabad Kingdom.

Career

Activism

As a volunteer in the left-wing andhra mahashaba movement, Dasarathi travelled from village to village in Telangana to enlighten the public.  Mahatma Gandhi and Kandukuri Veeresalingam influenced him.  However, he joined the political left, as most of his friends were leftists and communist revolutionaries.

Poetry

He began writing poetry very young when he was a student. His poetry was revolutionary and was influenced by the communist ideology of Karl Marx. The downtrodden, poor, exploited, workers were his subjects in poetry. He strongly believed that the capitalist, feudalist and autocratic society under Nizam rule would give way to democracy and equality.

After the Independence of India in 1947, many independent kingdoms and principalities joined the newly formed Indian Union. However, Hyderabad State under the autocratic rule of the then ruler Mir Osman Ali Khan did not join the Union. Mir Osaman Ali Khan failed to control the atrocities committed by the Mazlis Ittehadul Muslimeen Party. At this juncture, the State Congress Party under the leadership of Swamy Raamaanandateerdha called for an action against the autocratic Nizam's rule.  Thousands of people went to jail by responding to this call and participating in Satyagraha (civil disobedience).

Arrest and imprisonment

Dasarathi was arrested in 1947 and was sent to Warangal central jail, along with many other leaders who went on to prominence in independent India. Dasarathi was later moved to Nizamabad central jail. While in jail he wrote poetry. After his release he left Telangana for Vijayawada and wrote poetry against the Nizam in Telugu Desam, a daily paper devoted to news and articles related to Telangana and the Nizam's rule.

In 1948, the Indian Union took over the Hyderabad State in a police action and put an end to the autocratic Nizam rule and to the violence unleashed by the Razakars and Mazlis Ittehadul Muslimeen Party.  Later, in 1956 the Telangana part of the Hyderabad state was united with the state of Andhra and eventually formed the  state of Andhra Pradesh, which was till June 2, 2014.

After democratic rule was established in Hyderabad, Dasarathi served in the government of Andhra Pradesh for some time. Later, he worked for All India Radio Hyderabad and Madras (Chennai) as a prompter and retired in 1971.  He served as the Government Poet from 1971 through 1984.  He also rendered services as an emeritus producer for All India Radio and Doordarshan (Television).

Literary works

Daasrathi obtained fame through his revolutionary poetry. His first book Agnidhara (Flowing Fire) was published in 1947. This book is about the Telangana Armed Struggle against Nizams rule, in which young Daasarathi served as a revolutionary. Daasarathi wrote part of his book Agnidhara while he was in jail and completed it after his release.

His other works include Rudraveena (1950), Mahandrodyamam, Punarnavam, Amruthabishekam, Kavithapushpakam and Ghalib Geethalu (1961). Ghalib Geethalu is the Telugu translation of the poems of Urdu poet Mirza Asadullah Khan Ghalib. He has also composed Lyrics to many Telugu films.

Daasarathi said that the "Nizams brutal rule, Peoples woes under his rule, Indian Independence, Entry of Indian Armed Forces to free Nizams state and the fall of Nizam" as the inspiration for his writings.

Tollywood

He wrote lyrics for many Telugu movies. His debut movie was Vaagdanam.  He wrote lyrics for approximately 2000 songs in the Telugu film industry. He also wrote lyrics for the popular movies Iddaru Mitrulu (1962), Pooja.

Personal life
Daasarathi Krishnamacharyulu's younger brother Daasarathi Rangacharyulu is also an accomplished writer.

Bibliography
 He published Rudraveena in 1950, in which he described the life of starving poor.Mahaandhrodayam (2019),Punarnavam (2019),Mahaboadhi (2019),Galib geetaalu (2019),Dasarathi shatakamu (2019),Kavita pushpakam (2019),Timiram Tho Samaram (2019),Aalochanaalochanalu (2019) etc.Agnidhara Rudra VeenaNavami Yatraasmriti (2011), an autobiography

Filmography
 Vagdanam (1961)
 Iddaru Mitrulu (1961)
 Kiladi Bullodu (1972)
 Balipeetam (1975)
 Thota Ramudu (1975)
 Pooja (1976)Pelli Kani Pelli (1977)

Quotes"నా తెలంగాణ, కోటి రతనాల వీణ" ("naa telangaaNa, kOTi ratanaala vINa") [My Telangana is like the Veena (a beautiful hollow stringed instrument) decked with innumerable diamonds]"నాకు ఉర్దూ తెలుగు రెండు కళ్ళు, ఈ రెండు కళ్ళతో అన్ని భాషలని చదవగలను" ("naaku urdU telugu renDu kaLLu, I renDu kaLLatO anni Bashalani cadavagalanu"'') [Urdu and Telugu are my two eyes, with which I read every other language]

"Edi Kakati? Evate Rudrama? Evaru Rayalu? Evadu Singana? Anni Nene! Anta Nene! Telugu Nene! Velugu Nene!"

"Telanganamu Ritude! Musali Nakkaku Racharikambu Dakkune?"

"Na Geetavalulenta Dooramu Prayanambauno Andaka Ee Bhoogolambuna Aggi Vettedanu"

"Na Peru Praja Koti! Na Ooru Praja Vati!"

"Ranunnadi Edi Nijam? Adi Okate – Socialism!"

"Kammani na telangana tommidi jillalena? Asalandhra ku telangana paryayam kaada?"

"Maa Nizaam Raju Janma Janmaala Booju"

References 

1925 births
1987 deaths
People from Telangana
Telugu-language lyricists
Telugu writers
People from Warangal
Participants in the Telangana Rebellion
Recipients of the Sahitya Akademi Award in Telugu
Indian male poets
Telugu poets
20th-century Indian poets
20th-century Indian male writers
Urdu–Telugu translators